Betsy Nagelsen and Martina Navratilova defeated Ann Kiyomura and Candy Reynolds in the final, 6–4, 6–4 to win the women's doubles tennis title at the 1980 Australian Open.

Judy Chaloner and Diane Evers were the defending champions, but lost in the first round to Lee Duk-hee and Elizabeth Little.

Seeds
Champion seeds are indicated in bold text while text in italics indicates the round in which those seeds were eliminated. All four seeded teams received byes into the second round.

 Rosemary Casals /  Wendy Turnbull (semifinals)
 Pam Shriver /  Betty Stöve (quarterfinals)
 Ann Kiyomura /  Candy Reynolds (final)
 Betsy Nagelsen /  Martina Navratilova (champions)

Draw

Final

Top half

Bottom half

External links
 1980 Australian Open – Women's draws and results at the International Tennis Federation

Women's Doubles
Australian Open (tennis) by year – Women's doubles